Scott Derek Severin (born 15 February 1979 in Stirling) is a Scottish former professional footballer. Severin played for Heart of Midlothian, Aberdeen, Watford, Kilmarnock and Dundee United. Severin was club captain of Aberdeen for two seasons. He also made 15 appearances for the Scotland national football team. During his career, Severin played as a defensive midfielder, centre back, right back, striker, and once as a goalkeeper for Hearts.

Club career

Severin started his career at Heart of Midlothian. He was captain of the youth team that won the Scottish Youth Cup in 1998 under Peter Houston. Severin made his debut as a substitute in Hearts' 3–1 victory over Dundee United on 6 April 1999, and his first starting appearance came three weeks later in a 4–0 win against Motherwell. Severin started to play regularly for Hearts in the 1999–2000 season, making 28 appearances in all competitions and scoring his first professional goal in a Scottish League Cup match against Queen of the South. Hearts finished the season in third place, earning them qualification for the UEFA Cup and Severin's form earned him a new contract until 2004. In his first ever continental match, Severin scored Hearts' first goal in their 2–0 UEFA Cup Qualifying victory over Icelandic side ÍBV. Severin played once as a goalkeeper for Hearts, following an injury to Teuvo Moilanen.

In July 2004, Severin left Hearts on the expiration of his contract, and became Jimmy Calderwood's first signing at Aberdeen. He signed a new three-and-a-half-year contract with Aberdeen in December 2005. On the final day of the 2006–07 season, Severin scored in a victory against rivals Rangers which secured a UEFA Cup place for the following season. In July 2007 he was handed the captaincy of Aberdeen, succeeding Russell Anderson.

In June 2009 the Watford Observer reported he would be moving on a free transfer to Watford. Watford later confirmed that he would sign on 1 July 2009. Severin scored his first goal for Watford in a first round League Cup tie at Underhill Stadium against Barnet on 11 August 2009. On 1 February 2010, he joined Kilmarnock on loan until the end of the 2009–10 season. Severin made his first team debut for Kilmarnock a day later, as an 80th-minute substitute in a 1–0 Scottish Premier League win against Celtic.

Severin transferred to Dundee United on 31 August 2010, and scored his first goal for the club in a 4–2 win over Kilmarnock. He suffered a triple leg break in a SPL match against St Mirren on 6 August 2011. On 17 March 2012, Severin announced his retirement from professional football due to the injury he sustained against St Mirren.

International career 

Scotland manager Craig Brown gave Severin his international debut in a 2002 World Cup qualifier against Latvia in 2001. He won 15 caps for Scotland in total, with his only two starts coming in the 2006 Kirin Cup.

Statistics

Club appearances
All statistics correct as of match played 6 August 2011

A.  Includes appearances in European competition.
B.  For the 2007/08 season, Soccerbase has not recorded Severin's appearance for Aberdeen away to Dnipro in the UEFA Cup, so his European appearances for that season should be 8, not the 7 they have listed. Likewise with his overall total it should be one higher than they have listed.

Discipline
Correct as of 6 August 2011

International appearances

As of 29 October 2009, Severin has played 15 times for the Scotland national football team.

Scotland goals listed first

Honours
Heart of Midlothian
Scottish Youth Cup: 1997–98
Festival Cup: 2003

Scotland
Kirin Cup: 2006

References

External links

Scotland U21 stats at Fitbastats
Scotland B stats at Fitbastats

1979 births
Living people
Footballers from Stirling
Scottish footballers
Scotland under-21 international footballers
Scotland B international footballers
Scotland international footballers
Association football midfielders
Heart of Midlothian F.C. players
Aberdeen F.C. players
Watford F.C. players
Dundee United F.C. players
English Football League players
Scottish Premier League players
Kilmarnock F.C. players
Musselburgh Athletic F.C. players